Aizis (Aixis, Aixim, Airzis, Azizis, Azisis, Aizisis, Alzisis, Aigis, Aigizidava[*], Zizis) was a Dacian town mentioned by Emperor Trajan in his work Dacica. Located at Dealul Ruieni, Fârliug, Caraș-Severin, Banat, Romania.

One sentence surviving from Dacica, in the Latin grammar work of Priscian, says: inde Berzobim, deinde Aizi processimus, meaning We then advanced to Berzobim, next to Aizi. The phrase describes the initial itinerary march into Dacia by the Roman army
After the Roman conquest of Dacia, a castrum gets built at Aizis.

It is also depicted in the Tabula Peutingeriana, as Azizis, on a Roman road network, between Bersovia and Caput Bubali.

Etymology 
The place name Aizizi, located in the South West of Dacia has a root / radical containing the Bactrian "ait", Armenian "iz" 'snake' or better the Bactrian "azi" Armenian "ajts" 'goat'. The Romanian historian and archaeologist Vasile Pârvan also gives the meaning 'goat'.

This Dacian name (mentioned also by Ptolemy as ) confirms the Dacian language change from Proto-Indo-European *g to z: Αίζισίς (Ptolemy) < *aig-is(yo) – '(place) with goats' (Greek αίζ, αίγός goat)

See also 
 Dacia
 Roman Dacia
 Trajan
 Dacica
 List of ancient cities in Thrace and Dacia

Notes

References

Ancient

Modern

External links 

 Traiani Augusti, Dacica at Forum Romanum
 Monografia localității Fârliug by Pr. Cristian Franț
 

Dacian towns
Archaeological sites in Romania
Ruins in Romania
Former populated places in Romania
History of Banat